Macrorie is a surname of Scottish origin which means "son of Roderick." Notable people with the surname include:

Alma Macrorie (1904–1970), American film editor and actress
William Macrorie (1831–1905), bishop of Maritzburg

References

Surnames of Scottish origin
Patronymic surnames
Surnames from given names